Ene is both a given name and a surname.

Given name
Ene Ergma (born 1944), Estonian politician
Ene Järvis (born 1947), Estonian actress
Ene Kaups (born 1963), Estonian politician
Ene Mihkelson (born 1944), Estonian writer
Ene Franca Idoko (born 1985), Nigerian sprinter
Ene Rämmeld (born 1947), Estonian actress
Haide-Ene Rebassoo (born 1935), Estonian botanist
Ene Riisna (born 1938), Estonian-American television producer
Ene-Margit Tiit (born 1934), Estonian mathematician and statistician

Surname
Alexandru Ene (1928–2011), Romanian footballer
Ana Derșidan-Ene-Pascu (born 1944), Romanian fencer
Gheorghe Ene (1937–2009), Romanian footballer
Gigel Ene (born 1982), Romanian footballer
Noni Răzvan Ene (born 1992), Romanian singer
Orhun Ene (born 1967), Turkish former professional basketball player

Romanian-language surnames
Estonian feminine given names